John Millard Stemmons (July 10, 1909 - July 20, 2001) was a real estate developer and civic leader in Dallas, Texas.  He is best known for his efforts to develop the former flood plain of the Trinity River and his lucrative donation of land for the Stemmons Freeway that was named for his father, Leslie Stemmons.

Early life 

Stemmons attended public schools in Illinois and Dallas, Texas.  He graduated from Sunset High School in Dallas in 1927 and attended Washington and Lee University, where he received a football injury that prevented his service in World War II. He is a Member of the Sunset High School Hall of Fame.

Career 

He joined his father's company, Industrial Properties Corporation, in 1931.  The company's business was the development of the land recovered by the erection of a flood-controlling levee system.  He continued with the company after his father's death in 1939, rising to become president of Industrial Properties Corporation in 1954 and Chairman/CEO in 1971.  He retired in 1994 and was elected Chairman Emeritus.

Initial development of the recovered land was slowed by the onset of the Great Depression.  Stemmons partnered with Trammell Crow in the years following World War II as the growing economy improved the value of the property.  Their partnership ended when Crow's proposed Dallas Market Center project would involve considerable borrowing at the rate of 6% interest.  Stemmons could not imagine carrying such expensive debt, and so sold his interest to Crow.

In the terms of the gift, Stemmons stipulated that frontage roads be added to the project to provide freeway access that vastly increased the value of his property.

References 
 Dallas County Pioneer Association - Pioneer Stories
 The Handbook of Texas Online - Trammell Crow Company
 Dallas Morning News - Lessons from the Legends, 24 December 2005
 John Millard Stemmons obituary
 SMU Press release - $1 Million Gift from Stemmons Foundation to Support New Engineering Building at SMU

People from Dallas
1909 births
2001 deaths
Real estate and property developers